Križevci is a town in Koprivnica-Križevci County, central Croatia.

Križevci may also refer to:

Places
Croatia
Križevci, the old name of the village of Karadžićevo up until 1920

Slovenia
Križevci, Gornji Petrovci, a village in the Municipality of Gornji Petrovci in northeastern Slovenia (the traditional region of Prekmurje)
Municipality of Križevci, a municipality in northeastern Slovenia (the traditional region of Prlekija)
Križevci pri Ljutomeru, the seat of the municipality

Other uses
Eparchy of Križevci, part of the Byzantine Church of Croatia, Serbia and Montenegro
KK Križevci, a basketball club based in Križevci, Croatia
NK Križevci, a football club based in Križevci, Croatia
ŠD NK Križevci, a football club based in Križevci, Gornji Petrovci

See also
 Križevec
 Križe (disambiguation)
 Križ (disambiguation)